The Chamber of Deputies is a federal legislative body and the lower house of the National Congress of Brazil. The chamber comprises 513 deputies, who are elected by proportional representation to serve four-year terms. The current President of the Chamber is the Deputy Arthur Lira (PP-AL), who was elected on 1 February 2021.

Structure 
The number of deputies elected is proportional to the size of the population of the respective state (or of the Federal District) as of 1994. However, no delegation can be made up of less than eight or more than seventy seats. Thus the least populous state elects eight federal deputies and the most populous elects seventy. These restrictions favour the smaller states at the expense of the more populous states and so the size of the delegations is not exactly proportional to population.

Elections to the Chamber of Deputies are held every four years, with all seats up for election.

Federal representation
A census held every 10 years by the Brazilian Institute of Geography and Statistics is used as the basis for the distribution of the seats. Proportionality is followed as a principle, with the exception that there should be a minimum of eight (8) members and a maximum of seventy (70) members per state. Per the 2010 census, states with 3,258,117 inhabitants upwards have 9 to 70 deputies. 

As a result, although most states hover around an average of 362,013 inhabitants by deputy (per the 2010 census), some states with smaller populations have a much lower average, such as Roraima (1 for 51,000 inhabitants).

Present composition

Partisan blocs composition
Partisan bloc leadership is organized into the following roles:
 Government Leader: elected by members of the party of the Cabinet in the Chamber to speak on behalf of the cabinet
 Majority Leader: elected by the leaders of the majority bloc in the Chamber, usually in support of the Cabinet
 Opposition Leader: elected by the members of the largest party in opposition to the Cabinet
 Minority Leader: elected by the leaders of the minority bloc, usually in opposition to the Cabinet

Bodies
The House of Deputies is composed of the Bureau of the Chamber of Deputies of Brazil by College Leaders and the Commissions, which can be permanent, temporary, or special inquiry.

Bureau of the Chamber of Deputies of Brazil
The current composition of the Board of the Chamber of Deputies is the following:

President: Arthur Lira (PP-AL)
1st Vice President: Marcos Pereira (Republicanos-SP) 
2nd Vice President: Sóstenes Cavalcante (PL-RJ) 
1st Secretary: Luciano Bivar (UNIÃO-PE) 
2nd Secretary: Maria do Rosário (PT-RS) 
3rd Secretary: Júlio Cesar (PSD-PI) 
4th Secretary: Lucio Mosquini (MDB-RO) 
1st Substitute: Gilberto Nascimento (PSC-SP) 
2nd Substitute: Pompeo de Mattos (PDT-RS) 
3rd Substitute: Beto Pereira (PSDB-MS) 
4th Substitute: André Ferreira (PL-PE)

Standing committees 

On 6 March 2012, was defined division of committees between parties. The House President, Marco Maia, believes that the proportionality between the parties / blocs must take into account the data of the last election. Thus, PT and PMDB, with the highest benches, were three committees (the PT made the choice first). DEM and PSDB, the two largest opposition, were two commissions each. On the other hand, PSD, most harmed by this decision, filed a lawsuit in the Supreme Court (STF) trying to reverse this decision.

The chair of the committee, was defined as follows:

See also
Federal institutions of Brazil
56th Legislature of the National Congress
National Congress of Brazil
Federal Senate

Notes

References

External links
Official website of the Chamber of Deputies of Brazil
Chamber of Deputies' e-Democracy
Photo 360° of the Chamber of Deputies of Brazil 
List of all the presidents of the Brazilian Chamber of Deputies 

1826 establishments in Brazil
Legislative branch of Brazil
Brazil